Bangor Rangers is a Northern Irish junior level football club playing in Division 2B of the Northern Amateur Football League in Northern Ireland. Their home ground is at Aurora Leisure Centre in Bangor. As well as the first XI, the Club also has a second team playing in NAFL Division 3C. They also have youth teams playing at various age groups from under 17 and below.  They compete in various of leagues such as ABYDL, South Belfast and South East Antrim. The Club was started in Bangor Baptist Church and joined the Amateur League in 1986.

External links
 Bangor Rangers Official Club website
 Bangor Rangers Club website
 nifootball.co.uk - (For fixtures, results and tables of all Northern Ireland amateur football
   for U17s fixtures and results leagues)

Notes

Association football clubs in Northern Ireland
Association football clubs in County Down
Northern Amateur Football League clubs